Amblyrhynchotes is a genus of pufferfishes native to the Indian and Pacific Oceans.

Species
There are at least two recognized species in this genus:
 Amblyrhynchotes honckenii (Bloch, 1785) (evileye blaasop)
 Amblyrhynchotes rufopunctatus S. C. Li, 1962

References 

Tetraodontidae
Marine fish genera
Taxa named by Franz Hermann Troschel